

List of El Salvador Football League Top Scorers

References

Salvadoran Primera División
El Salvador